Odo Dam  is a gravity dam located in Kochi Prefecture in Japan. The dam is used for flood control, water supply and power production. The catchment area of the dam is 688.9 km2. The dam impounds about 201  ha of land when full and can store 66000 thousand cubic meters of water. The construction of the dam was started on 1966 and completed in 1986.

References 

Dams in Kōchi Prefecture
Dams completed in 1986